Star Trek: Enterprise is an American science fiction television series that originally aired on the UPN network from September 26, 2001 to May 13, 2005. Until the episode "Extinction" towards the start of the third season, the series was called simply Enterprise without the Star Trek prefix. The series aired for 97 (DVD and original broadcast) or 98 (syndicated) episodes across four seasons, centering on the adventures of the 22nd century starship Enterprise. They are the first deep space explorers in Starfleet, using the first Warp 5 equipped vessel. It was set within the universe of the Star Trek franchise, with the series placed earlier in the chronology than Star Trek: The Original Series.

Following the end of Star Trek: Voyager, executive producers Rick Berman and Brannon Braga entered immediately into production on Enterprise in line with feedback from the studio. They remained sole executive producers and show runners until the fourth season when Manny Coto took the lead on the show. He had joined the crew as co-producer during the third season. The pilot, "Broken Bow", was watched by 12.5 million viewers on the first broadcast on UPN. After the first few weeks of episodes, the ratings were considered to be solid enough and the expectation was that the series would run for seven seasons in the same manner as The Next Generation, Deep Space Nine and Voyager. However, the viewing figures began to decrease towards the end of the season. Changes were made for the third season, with the introduction of the season-long Xindi storyline. This improved the reviews that the series was receiving, but the ratings continued to decrease. Critics began to talk of giving Star Trek a break from television and suggesting that the decline was caused by overall franchise fatigue. UPN cut the 26 episode order for the third season to 24, meaning that if 24 episodes were created for the fourth season as well then they would have the 100 episodes needed for syndication. However, it was cancelled two episodes short of this target.

Series overview

Episodes

Season 1 (2001–02) 

"Broken Bow" aired as a two-hour episode on UPN. When the series entered syndication, it began airing as a two-part episode.

Season 2 (2002–03)

Season 3 (2003–04)

Season 4 (2004–05)

Ratings

See also

 Lists of Star Trek episodes

References

External links
 StarTrek.com Enterprise Episodes
 

 
Enterprise episodes
Star Trek: Enterprise
ca:Star Trek: Enterprise#Capítols